Kálmán is a Hungarian surname and given name.

Kalman may also refer to:

 4992 Kálmán, a main belt asteroid
 Kalman decomposition
 Kalman filter
 Ensemble Kalman filter (EnKF), a recursive filter
 Extended Kalman filter
 Fast Kalman filter (FKF)
 Kalman–Yakubovich–Popov lemma